Lester John Pratt (October 8, 1887 – January 8, 1969) was a catcher in Major League Baseball in 1914 and 1915.

Sources

1887 births
1969 deaths
Boston Red Sox players
Newark Peppers players
Brooklyn Tip-Tops players
Major League Baseball catchers
Baseball players from Illinois
New Bedford Whalers (baseball) players
Birmingham Barons players
People from Gibson City, Illinois
People from Ford County, Illinois
Terrell Terrors players
Charleston Broom Corn Cutters players
Shelbyville Queen Citys players